Juan Alberto Melgar Castro (20 June 1930 – 2 December 1987) was a army officer in the Honduran military who served as the head of state of Honduras from 22 April 1975 to 7 August 1978, when he was removed from power by others in the military.

Presidency
General Melgar Castro took power in the 1975 Honduran coup d'état which removed Oswaldo López Arellano after his bribery scandal with United Fruit Company.

During his rule, the process of land reform was slowed down, because of pressure from land-owning sectors and influential politicians.

Biography
His wife Nora Gúnera de Melgar was Mayor of Tegucigalpa. She was the nominee of the National Party (Partido Nacional) for President of Honduras in 1997, but lost to the Liberal Party nominee, Carlos Roberto Flores.

General Melgar Castro died of a heart attack near San Pedro Sula on 2 December 1987 .

References

External links
National Party of Honduras official site

1930 births
1987 deaths
People from La Paz Department (Honduras)
Presidents of Honduras
Leaders who took power by coup
Leaders ousted by a coup